Lamping Peak is a rock peak standing between Prebble Glacier and Wyckoff Glacier, on the western slopes of the Queen Alexandra Range, Antarctica. It was named by the Advisory Committee on Antarctic Names for John T. Lamping, a United States Antarctic Research Program geomagnetist at South Pole Station, 1961.

References

Mountains of the Ross Dependency
Shackleton Coast